Jalopy is a simulation video game developed by English indie studio MinskWorks and published by Excalibur Games. The game follows two characters, the player and their uncle, who attempt to build a Laika (a car modelled after the Trabant 601) from individual parts and drive from East Berlin to Turkey using it.

Premise & Plot 
The game follows the player character known only as Splat and his Uncle Lütfi, two Germans of Turkish descent from Eastern Berlin who have decided to go on a road trip to Istanbul since the Iron Curtain fell. The main task of the game is to get to Istanbul to drop the Uncle off all the while maintaining the Laika (heavily based on the Trabant 601) which is prone to frequent breakdowns signified by smoke coming from the sides of the bonnet. The player passes through East Germany, Czechoslovakia, Hungary, Yugoslavia, Bulgaria and Turkey on his trip with his uncle. The cities he stops in all contain shops important to maintaining his car, and to sell objects found in discarded boxes strewn across the roads on his trip. The player may choose to upgrade the Laika if he has enough money.

When the uncle falls asleep in the hotel, the player can open his briefcase and collect notes that put together a backstory. It turns out the player and the uncle have been separated from the rest of their family residing in West Berlin for almost 30 years because the Uncle was with him as a baby on the East Side the night the Berlin Wall was erected on August 12, 1961. The uncle has been keeping in contact with the rest of the family, especially his mother, while he kept everything oblivious to him those 30 years. Both of the parents died before the Berlin Wall was torn down, and the mother's last wish was for her husband's ashes to be scattered across the Bosporus when they arrive in Istanbul (which is the reason why Uncle talked his nephew in on going on this seemingly random road trip). After he drops him off in Istanbul, he is never seen again, with him simply leaving a note telling his nephew that he has to go do something alone and to look after himself and to live his life fully. After that the game never ends. The player can reset from the beginning and do it all over again as many times as he wants. The only difference being Uncle is absent for the entirety of the game.

Release 
The game was added to Steam Greenlight in February 2016, entered Early Access on Steam on 22 April 2016. It left early access with the launch of version 1.0 on 28 March 2018.

Reception 
The game received generally positive reviews from Rock, Paper, Shotgun, PC Gamer, Evo and GameSpot.

References 

2018 video games
First-person adventure games
Vehicle simulation games
Video games developed in the United Kingdom
Video games with cel-shaded animation
Windows games
Video games set in Germany
Video games set in the Czech Republic
Video games set in Slovakia
Video games set in Hungary
Video games set in Bulgaria
Video games set in Turkey
Video games set in Bosnia and Herzegovina
Video games set in Croatia
Video games set in Serbia
Video games set in Montenegro
Video games set in Slovenia
Video games set in Europe
Yugoslavia in fiction
Cold War fiction
Cold War video games
Xbox One games
Indie video games
Video games set in East Germany